Reichsstraße is German and literally means "imperial road". It may refer to:

 Imperial road, or Reichsstraße, a major European route in medieval times that was under the imperial or royal ban
 Reichsstraße (Austria), the most important road class in the imperial and royal (k.u.k.) state of Austria until 1918
 Reichsstraße (Deutsches Reich), the second most important road class in the German Empire from 1934 (after the motorways or autobahnen)
 Road names in Germany, Austria and Switzerland, some of which recall historic Reichsstraßen

See also 
 Reichsautobahn
 Riksväg